Timbuktu Cercle is an administrative subdivision of the Tombouctou Region of Mali. It is the largest cercle by area in the whole of Mali. The capital lies at the city of Timbuktu. The cercle is divided into Rural and Urban Communes, and below this, quarters/villages. In the 2009 census the cercle had a population of 124,546.

Communes
Timbuktu Cercle contains the following six communes:

 Alafia
 Ber 
 Bourem-Inaly
 Lafia
 Salam
 Timbuktu (Tombouctou) (an Urban Commune)

References

Cercles of Mali
Tombouctou Region